Martina Bircher (born 13 April 1984) is a Swiss economist and politician. She currently serves as a member of the National Council (Switzerland) for the Swiss People's Party since 2019.

Early life and education 
Bircher was born 13 April 1984 in Zürich, Switzerland. She primarily grew-up in Niederwil, Aargau where she attended public schools. She initially completed a commercial apprenticeship at Alu Menziken. Bircher then studied economics at the University of Applied Sciences Northwestern Switzerland with a major in controlling.

Professional career 
Bircher had her initial work experience in the retail field before joining Swiss Post in 2014, in a project manager position. She currently works as a self-employed consultant and advisor (Bircher Consulting) and is a paid member of ZofingenRegio, a regional association. Further, she volunteers on several board of trustees, such as; Winterhilfe Aargau, Villmergen (welfare services); AGS Aargauer Suchthilfe, Aarau (addition treatment and prevention); Willy-Mettler-Stiftung, Aarburg (integration of disabled people) as well as an executive director of PIKOM, Aarau (non-partisan information committee) and Perspective CH in Aarau.

Politics 
In 2013, she campaigned for a seat on the municipal council of Aarburg, as a member of the Swiss People's Party. Bircher assumed office in 2014 and took-over the commission for social services, health and youth. Since 2017, when she was elected into Grand Council of Aargau, she has served in the social services and health commission. Subsequently, she was elected in the 2019 Swiss federal election to serve as a member of the National Council (Switzerland) assuming office on 2 December 2019.

Personal life 
Bircher is in a relationship with Fabian Meyer, who is a homemaker. They have one son.

References 

1984 births
Living people